The Baden cabinet (German: Kabinett Baden) was the final Reichsregierung or Imperial Government of the German Empire. It was formed on 4 October 1918 by Prince Max von Baden, who had been appointed as Reichskanzler (Chancellor) the day before by Emperor Wilhelm II. It was the first cabinet of the Empire to include members of the Social Democratic Party of Germany (SPD). After the constitution was changed in late October 1918, the Chancellor and his government were for the first time accountable to the Reichstag (parliament). Previous governments had been accountable just to the Emperor.

The cabinet would be in office only until 9 November 1918. As a result of the German Revolution, Max von Baden resigned that day, after having announced the abdication of the Emperor. The social democrat Friedrich Ebert took over as Chancellor.

The members of the cabinet (most of them known as Staatssekretäre or "Secretaries of State") were as follows:

Composition

|}

Notes

References

Historic German cabinets
1918 establishments in Germany
1918 disestablishments in Germany
Cabinets established in 1918
Cabinets disestablished in 1918